Busanan Ongbamrungphan (Thai: บุศนันท์ อึ๊งบำรุงพันธ์; born 22 March 1996) is a Thai badminton player who specializes in singles. She competed at the 2014 and 2018 Asian Games as well as the 2020 Summer Olympics.

Achievements

Southeast Asian Games 
Women's singles

Youth Olympic Games 
Girls' singles

BWF World Junior Championships 
Girls' singles

Asian Youth Games 
Girls' singles

Asian Junior Championships 
Girls' singles

BWF World Tour (3 titles, 2 runners-up)
The BWF World Tour, which was announced on 19 March 2017 and implemented in 2018, is a series of elite badminton tournaments, sanctioned by Badminton World Federation (BWF). The BWF World Tour is divided into six levels, namely World Tour Finals, Super 1000, Super 750, Super 500, Super 300 (part of the BWF World Tour), and the BWF Tour Super 100.

Women's singles

BWF Grand Prix (4 titles, 6 runners-up)
The BWF Grand Prix had two levels, the Grand Prix and Grand Prix Gold. It was a series of badminton tournaments sanctioned by the Badminton World Federation (BWF) and played between 2007 and 2017.

Women's singles

  BWF Grand Prix Gold tournament
  BWF Grand Prix tournament

Performance timeline

National team 
 Junior level

 Senior level

Individual competitions 
 Junior level

 Senior level

Record against selected opponents 
Record against Year-end Finals finalists, World Championships semi-finalists, and Olympic quarter-finalists. Accurate as of 5 November 2022.

Personal life 
She is interested in Lego as a hobby.

References

External links 
 
 
 

1996 births
Living people
Busanan Ongbamrungphan
Busanan Ongbamrungphan
Badminton players at the 2014 Summer Youth Olympics
Badminton players at the 2020 Summer Olympics
Busanan Ongbamrungphan
Badminton players at the 2014 Asian Games
Badminton players at the 2018 Asian Games
Busanan Ongbamrungphan
Asian Games medalists in badminton
Medalists at the 2018 Asian Games
Competitors at the 2013 Southeast Asian Games
Competitors at the 2015 Southeast Asian Games
Competitors at the 2017 Southeast Asian Games
Competitors at the 2019 Southeast Asian Games
Busanan Ongbamrungphan
Busanan Ongbamrungphan
Southeast Asian Games medalists in badminton
Busanan Ongbamrungphan
Universiade medalists in badminton
Medalists at the 2015 Summer Universiade
Busanan Ongbamrungphan
Busanan Ongbamrungphan
Busanan Ongbamrungphan